Joe Huston (March 10, 1915 – March 21, 1975) was an American football player and coach and college athletic administrator. He served as the head football coach at Lewis & Clark College in Portland, Oregon, from 1947 to 1964. Huston was also the school's athletic director from 1964 to 1972.

Huston began his coaching career at the high school level, first at Bend High School in Bend, Oregon, and then at Roosevelt High School and Grant High School in Portland. He was hired at Lewis & Clark in September 1947 to succeed Robert L. Mathews, who died suddenly on September 1.

Huston was born March 10, 1915, in Colfax, Washington. He died on March 21, 1975, of an apparent heart attack in his sleep, at his home in Portland.

Head coaching record

College

References

1910s births
1975 deaths
American football guards
Oregon Ducks football players
Lewis & Clark Pioneers athletic directors
Lewis & Clark Pioneers football coaches
High school football coaches in Oregon
People from Colfax, Washington